William D'Arcy Danychuk (August 29, 1940 – December 27, 2019) was an all-star offensive lineman in the Canadian Football League.  The two-time CFL All-Star played from 1964 to 1975 for the Hamilton Tiger-Cats.  Danychuk was a part of three Grey Cup Championship teams during his time with Hamilton.

He was born in northern Ontario and moved to Niagara-on-the-Lake from Quebec in his teens. Danychuk attended Niagara District Secondary School during the first years the school opened and began his football career there that eventually led him to the CFL. He died from cancer in 2019 at the age of 79.

References

Sources
 

1940 births
Canadian football offensive linemen
Players of Canadian football from Ontario
Hamilton Tiger-Cats players
2019 deaths
Canadian players of American football
Tennessee Volunteers football players
Sportspeople from Timmins